Marten Ykes (Max) Nauta (Deventer, 2 April 1896 – Amsterdam, 18 December 1957) was a Dutch painter and stained glass artist. His work was part of the painting event in the art competition at the 1924 Summer Olympics. Nauta's work was included in the 1939 exhibition and sale Onze Kunst van Heden (Our Art of Today) at the Rijksmuseum in Amsterdam.

References

Further reading
 Pluym, Willem van der; M. Muller; Emile van Loo: Max Nauta. Amsterdam, Het Hollandsche Uitgevershuis, 1948
 Pieter A. Scheen: "Nauta, Max". In: Lexicon der Nederlandse Beeldende Kunstenaars

1896 births
1957 deaths
19th-century Dutch painters
20th-century Dutch painters
Dutch male painters
Olympic competitors in art competitions
People from Deventer
19th-century Dutch male artists
20th-century Dutch male artists